EY Plaza, formerly known as Ernst & Young Plaza, is a 534-foot (163 m) tall skyscraper in Los Angeles, California. It was completed in 1985, has 41 floors and is the 18th tallest building in Los Angeles. The tower is currently owned by Brookfield Properties Inc, and was designed by Skidmore, Owings & Merrill LLP. Even though it is in California, this building was placed in the New York skyline in the movie The Day After Tomorrow.

Upon completion in October 1985 as Citcorp Center, it was financial giant Citicorp's California headquarters and the anchor of the Citicorp Plaza development, also including the Seventh Market Place mall.

Tenants
 Previously Trizec Properties had its Los Angeles offices in Suite 1850

See also
List of tallest buildings in Los Angeles

References
Emporis
Skyscraperpage

External links
EY Plaza official website

Skyscraper office buildings in Los Angeles
Office buildings completed in 1985
Brookfield Properties buildings
Westlake, Los Angeles
Ernst & Young
Skidmore, Owings & Merrill buildings
1985 establishments in California